The following television stations broadcast on digital or analog channel 30 in Mexico:

 XHAB-TDT in Matamoros, Tamaulipas
 XHAF-TDT in Tepic, Nayarit 
 XHBAS-TDT in Banamichi, Sonora 
 XHBZC-TDT in La Paz, Baja California Sur 
 XHCBC-TDT in Ciudad Constitución, Baja California Sur 
 XHCCA-TDT in Campeche, Campeche
 XHCLT-TDT in Celaya, Guanajuato 
 XHCOM-TDT in Comitán de Domínguez, Chiapas 
 XHCOQ-TDT in Cozumel, Quintana Roo 
 XHGDU-TDT in San Diego de la Unión, Guanajuato
 XHGJI-TDT in San José Iturbide, Guanajuato
 XHGSC-TDT in Santa Catarina, Guanajuato
 XHHO-TDT in Hermosillo, Sonora
 XHICCH-TDT in Chihuahua, Chihuahua
 XHIR-TDT in Iguala, Guerrero
 XHJCI-TDT in Ciudad Juárez, Chihuahua
 XHJCM-TDT in Aguascalientes, Aguascalientes 
 XHLBT-TDT in Lázaro Cárdenas, Michoacán de Ocampo 
 XHLUT-TDT in La Rosita - Villagrán, Tamaulipas 
 XHMH-TDT in Hidalgo del Parral, Chihuahua 
 XHND-TDT in Durango, Durango 
 XHOPEM-TDT in Toluca, México
 XHOPMQ-TDT in Querétaro, Querétaro de Arteaga
 XHOPPA-TDT in Puebla, Puebla
 XHPNT-TDT in Piedras Negras, Coahuila
 XHPSO-TDT in Matías Romero, Oaxaca 
 XHQ-TDT in Culiacán, Sinaloa
 XHRCG-TDT in Saltillo, Coahuila de Zaragoza 
 XHRCS-TDT in San Luis Rio Colorado, Sonora
 XHSPG-TDT in Acapulco, Guerrero
 XHSPR-TDT in México City
 XHTAP-TDT in Tapachula, Chiapas 
 XHTET-TDT in Tenosique, Tabasco 
 XHTON-TDT in Tonalá, Chiapas 
 XHTP-TDT in Mérida, Yucatán 
 XHTVL-TDT in Villahermosa, Tabasco 
 XHURT-TDT in Uruapan, Michoacán de Ocampo 
 XHVST-TDT in Ciudad Valles, San Luis Potosí
 XHZAE-TDT in Zacatecas, Zacatecas

30